Lake Rotorua is  due west of Kaikoura in the Canterbury region of the South Island of New Zealand.

A 2010 report showed that Lake Rotorua had the second highest trophic level index, an indication of pollutant levels, of all the lakes that were measured.

See also
Lakes of New Zealand

References

Rotorua